Sajjan may refer to:

 Sajjan (newspaper), a Punjabi newspaper published in Lahore, Punjab, Pakistan
 Sajjan (actor) (1921–2000), Bollywood and stage actor
 Harjit Sajjan (b. 1970), Canadian Minister of Defence under Prime Minister Justin Trudeau